Guy is a 2018 French comedy film directed, written and starring Alex Lutz.

This is a mockumentary of a 73-year-old French pop singer, "Guy Jamet" (Alex Lutz), whose heyday was three or more decades ago, touring to promote a new album of covers. Pretending to film a documentary about him is Gauthier (Tom Dingler), who suspects Guy may be his biological father based on a letter written by his recently deceased mother that he (Gauthier) discovered.  Guy is a "compilation of a number of classic" French crooners, and the film is made up of interviews by Gauthier of Guy with references to French TV shows and personalities. These are interrupted by performances of Guy's soft, sentimental pop songs before enthusiastic audiences during his tour.

Cast
 Alex Lutz as Guy Jamet
 Tom Dingler as Gauthier
 Pascale Arbillot as Sophie Ravel
 Nicole Calfan as Stéphanie Madhani
 Dani as Anne-Marie
 Élodie Bouchez as Young Anne-Marie
 Marina Hands as Kris-Eva
 Bruno Sanches as Frédéric
 Anne Marivin as Marie-France
 Nicole Ferroni as Juliette Bose
 Sarah Suco as Sara
 Brigitte Roüan as Gauthier's mother
 Catherine Hosmalin as The friend
 Alessandra Sublet as Herself
 Julien Clerc as Himself
 Michel Drucker as Himself

Reception
The Hollywood Reporter considered Guy to be "A sparkling, ironic salute to age and passing time".

References

External links
 

2018 films
2018 comedy films
French comedy films
2010s French-language films
2010s French films